Harriet Wadsworth Winslow (née Lathrop; 1796–1833), born in Norwich, Connecticut, was a prominent missionary attached to American Board of Commissioners for Foreign Missions.

She was married at age 23 to fellow missionary Rev. Miron Winslow. They were both deputed to Ceylon, now Sri Lanka, as part of the American Ceylon Mission.

She founded Asia’s first all-girls boarding school in Uduvil, Jaffna called Uduvil Girls' College. It was called Missionary Seminary and Female Central School.

References

People from Norwich, Connecticut
1796 births
1833 deaths
American Congregationalist missionaries
American Ceylon Mission
Female Christian missionaries
American expatriates in Sri Lanka
Congregationalist missionaries in Sri Lanka